Ethanol from coal is the ethanol produced using coal as its carbon source.  The anaerobic bacterium Clostridium ljungdahlii produces ethanol and acetic acid from CO, CO2, and H2 in synthesis gas. Early studies with C. ljungdahlii showed that relatively high concentrations of ethanol were produced. This process involves three main steps:
Gasification: Thermal gasification at temperatures of up to 2,200°F in a reducing, very low oxygen atmosphere transforms organic materials into simple CO, CO2 and H2 gases.
Fermentation: The acetogenic C. ljungdahlii convert the carbon monoxide into ethanol.
Distillation: Ethanol is separated from hydrogen and water.

Sources
 Green car
 Springerlink
 Resting cells
 Ethanol from coal advancing

Coal
Ethanol
Synthetic fuels
Ethanol fuel